Compulsive behavior (or compulsion) is defined as performing an action persistently and repetitively. Compulsive behaviors could be an attempt to make obsessions go away. The act is usually a small, restricted and repetitive behavior, yet not disturbing in a pathological way. Compulsive behaviors are a need to reduce apprehension caused by internal feelings a person wants to abstain from or control. A major cause of compulsive behavior is said to be obsessive–compulsive disorder (OCD). "The main idea of compulsive behavior is that the likely excessive activity is not connected to the purpose to which it appears directed." There are many different types of compulsive behaviors including shopping, hoarding, eating, gambling, trichotillomania and picking skin, itching, checking, counting, washing, sex, and more. Also, there are cultural examples of compulsive behavior.

Disorders in which it is seen
Addiction and obsessive–compulsive disorder (OCD) feature compulsive behavior as core features. Addiction is simply a compulsion toward a rewarding stimulus. Whereas in OCD, a compulsion is a facet of the disorder. The most common compulsions for people with OCD are washing and checking.

While not all compulsive behaviors are addictions, some such as compulsive sexual behavior have been identified as behavioral addictions.

Occurrence 
About 50 million people in the world today appear to have some type of obsessive-compulsive disorder. Affected people are often more secretive than other people with psychological problems, so the more serious psychological disorders are diagnosed more often. Many who exhibit compulsive behavior will claim it is not a problem and may endure the condition for years before seeking help.

Types

Shopping
Compulsive shopping is characterized by excessive shopping that causes impairment in a person's life such as financial issues or not being able to commit to a family. The prevalence rate for this compulsive behavior is 5.8% worldwide, and a majority of the people who are affected by this type of behavior are women (approximately 80%). There is no proven treatment for this type of compulsive behavior.

Hoarding

Hoarding is characterized by excessive saving of possessions and having problems when throwing these belongings away. Major features of hoarding include not being able to use the capacity of one's living quarters efficiently, having difficulty moving throughout the home due to the massive amount of possessions, as well as having blocked exits that can pose a danger to the hoarder and their family and guests. Items that are typically saved by hoarders include clothes, newspapers, containers, junk mail, books, and craft items. Hoarders believe these items will be useful in the future or they are too sentimental to throw them away. Other reasons include fear of losing important documents and information and object characteristics.

Eating
Compulsive overeating is the inability to control one's amount of nutritional intake, resulting in excessive weight gain. This overeating is usually a coping mechanism to deal with issues in the individual's life such as stress. Most compulsive over-eaters know that what they are doing is not good for them. The compulsive behavior usually develops in early childhood. People who struggle with compulsive eating usually do not have proper coping skills to deal with the emotional issues that cause their overindulgence in food. They indulge in binges, periods of varying duration in which they eat and/or drink without pause until the compulsion passes or they are unable to consume any more. These binges are usually accompanied by feelings of guilt and shame about using food to avoid emotional stress. This compulsive behavior can have deadly side effects including, but not limited to, binge eating, depression, withdrawal from activities due to weight, and spontaneous dieting. Though this is a very serious compulsive behavior, getting treatment and a proper diet plan can help individuals overcome these behaviors.
In Eating disorders (like anorexia nervosa and bulimia nervosa) person is preoccupied with weight, body and caloric intake. In this, there are certain behaviors, which are maladaptive and persistent and could be viewed as compulsive behaviors. For instance, restricting what the person eats, vomiting, abusing laxatives and over-exercising.

But if a person engages in such type of behaviors, he will see them as a necessary mechanism for controlling weight. He will not view these behaviors as problematic.

Binge eating may be considered as compulsive behaviors. In this, a person may realize that he is overeating and regret it after some time.

Gambling

Compulsive gambling is characterized by having the desire to gamble and not being able to resist said desires. The gambling leads to serious personal and social issues in the individual's life. This compulsive behavior usually begins in early adolescence for men and between the ages of 20-40 for women. People who have issues controlling compulsions to gamble usually have an even harder time resisting when they are having a stressful time in life. People who gamble compulsively tend to run into issues with family members, the law, and the places and people they gamble with. The majority of the issues with this compulsive behavior are due to lack of money to continue gambling or pay off debt from previous gambling. Compulsive gambling can be helped with various forms of treatment such as Cognitive Behavioral Therapy, Self-help or Twelve-step programs, and potentially medication.

Trichotillomania and skin picking

Trichotillomania is classified as a compulsive picking of hair of the body. It can be from any place on the body that has hair. This picking results in bald spots. Most people who have mild trichotillomania can overcome it via concentration and more self-awareness.

Those with compulsive skin picking have issues with picking, rubbing, digging, or scratching the skin. These activities are usually to get rid of unwanted blemishes or marks on the skin. These compulsions also tend to leave abrasions and irritation on the skin. This can lead to infection or other issues in healing. These acts tend to be prevalent in times of anxiety, boredom, or stress. Reviews recommend behavioral interventions such as habit reversal training and decoupling.

Checking, counting, washing, and repeating
Compulsive checking can include compulsively checking items such as locks, switches, and appliances. This type of compulsion usually deals with checking whether harm to oneself or others is possible. Usually, most checking behaviors occur due to wanting to keep others and the individual safe; this condition is also known as obsessive-compulsive behavior.

People with compulsive counting tend to have a specific number that is of importance in the situation they are in. When a number is considered significant, the individual has a desire to do the behavior such as wiping one's face off the number of times that is significant. Compulsive counting can include instances of counting things such as steps, items, behaviors, and mental counting.

Compulsive washing is usually found in individuals that have a fear of contamination. People that have compulsive hand washing behaviors wash their hands repeatedly throughout the day. These hand washings can be ritualized and follow a pattern. People that have problems with compulsive hand washing tend to have problems with chapped or red hands due to the excessive amount of washing done each day.

Compulsive repeating is characterized by doing the same activity multiple times over. These activities can include re-reading a part of a book multiple times, re-writing something multiple times, repeating routine activities, or saying the same phrase over and over.

Sexual behavior
This type of compulsive behavior is characterized by feelings, thoughts, and behaviors about anything related to sex. These thoughts have to be pervasive and cause problems in health, occupation, socialization, or other parts of life. These feelings, thoughts, and behaviors can include normal sexual behaviors or behaviors that are considered illegal and/or morally and culturally unacceptable. This disorder is also known as hypersexuality, hypersexual disorder, nymphomania or sexual addiction. Controversially, some scientists have characterized compulsive sexual behavior as sexual addiction, although no such condition is recognized by mainstream medical diagnostic manuals.

Talking

Compulsive talking goes beyond the bounds of what is considered to be a socially acceptable amount of talking. The two main factors in determining if someone is a compulsive talker are talking in a continuous manner, only stopping when the other person starts talking, and others perceiving their talking as a problem. Personality traits that have been positively linked to this compulsion include assertiveness, willingness to communicate, self-perceived communication competence, and neuroticism. Studies have shown that most people who are talkaholics are aware of the amount of talking they do, are unable to stop, and do not see it as a problem.

See also
 Obsessive–compulsive disorder
 Addictive behavior#Compulsion vs addiction
 Compulsive lying
 Twelve-step program

References

Further reading
 Sándor Ferenczi, 'The Compulsion to Symmetrical Touching', Further Contributions to the Theory and Technique of Psychoanalysis (1926)
 A. J. Lewis, 'Obsessional Illness', in Inquiries in Psychiatry (1967)
 Rob Long, Obsessive Compulsive Disorder (2005)
 Lennard J. Davis, Obsession; A History (2008)

Habit and impulse disorders